Didac Ortega Orts (born 5 April 1982 in Valencia) is a Spanish former professional cyclist.

Major results
2005
 1st Stage 4 Vuelta Ciclista a León

References 

1982 births
Spanish male cyclists
Living people
Sportspeople from Valencia
Cyclists from the Valencian Community